Fremantle Football Club entered the Australian Football League in 1995, and the women's team entered the AFL Women's league in its inaugural season in 2017. Only players in league games are included in the ordered list; players who were on the Fremantle playing list but only played in pre-season or scratch matches are listed separately at the end of the article.

Fremantle Football Club players

1990s

2000s

2010s

2020s

Fremantle women

Other players

Listed players yet to play an AFL game for Fremantle men's team

Listed players yet to play an AFLW game for Fremantle women's team

Delisted players who did not play an AFL game for Fremantle

Delisted players who did not play an AFLW game for Fremantle

See also
 Category of Fremantle players, ordered alphabetically
 Fremantle Football Club drafting and trading history

References

External links
 Full List of Fremantle Players at AFL Tables
 Every Senior Listed Player from the Fremantle FC Official Website

Fremantle Football Club

Fremantle
Fremantle-related lists
Fremantle Football Club (AFLW) players